A love song is a song about romantic love, falling in love, heartbreak after a breakup, and the feelings that these experiences bring. A comprehensive list of even the best known performers and composers of love songs would be a large order.

Love songs can be found in a variety of different music genres.

History
Love songs have been around for centuries and can be found in the histories and cultures of most societies, though their ubiquity is a modern phenomenon.

The oldest known love song is the love song of Shu-Sin, which was discovered in the library of Ashurbanipal in Mesopotamia. It's about both romantic and erotic love. Prior to the discovery of the love song of Shu-Sin, Solomon's Song of Songs from the Bible was considered the oldest love song.

Early history
There are several theories about the origin of music in a general sense. According to Charles Darwin, it has to do with the choice of partner between woman and man (women choose male partners based on musical performances), and so the first music would be love music. Herbert Spencer saw music develop from a passionate eloquence, and music arise as an expression of emotions.

In Ancient Greece civilization music was certainly made at weddings, and there were certainly love songs, as Erato as a muse was the protector of the love song, but our knowledge is written on myths and on pictures (as on vases) and not on written music based. It was not until the ninth century that a musical notation was developed in the Eastern Roman Empire, the neume notation, and after the addition of lines the staff was created around the 11th century, with which music is only well documented from this period.

Medieval music 
A highly controversial and startling explanation of the genesis of love songs can be found in Denis de Rougemont's "Love in the Western World". De Rougemont's thesis is that the love song grew out of the courtly love songs of the troubadours, and that those songs represented a rejection of the historical Christian notion of love.

Mediaeval love songs are called "Minnelied" in Middle High German, chant d'amour courtois by troubadour (Langues d'oc) or trouvère (Langues d'oïl). The (unfulfilled, unattainable) courtly love in a noble environment is therefore central. The worship of the lady is a recurring theme. A number of personae also constantly return, such as the lover who regrets being rejected by his lady, the lady who regrets the absence of her lord who is on a crusade. Generosity, nobility of character, receptivity to new experiences and attention to beauty and appearance are also common themes.  The 14th century Codex Manesse includes love songs by dukes as John I, Duke of Brabant and William IX, Duke of Aquitaine.

The Gruuthuse manuscript - written in Middle Dutch - composed around 1400 in Bruges contains 147 songs, including a number of love songs with musical notation. The manuscript is from several lyricists, mostly unknown.

Renaissance
Francesco Petrarca has sung his beloved Laura in 366 poems, collected in "Canzonière". The poems were set to music by, among others, Claudio Monteverdi, Orlando di Lasso and Guillaume Dufay (Vergene bella).

Classical music
Within Classical music, Romanticism is most commonly associated with love music, especially romantic love music, and the love song is called a romance, although the term is not limited to vocal music.

The Oxford Dictionary of Music states that "generally it implies a specially personal or tender quality". A romance can be narrative and usually amorous, but also a simple aria in an opera, as examples, Plaisir d'amour by Padre Martini and Georges Bizet's aria "Je crois entendre encore" (romance de Nadir) from the opera Les pêcheurs de perles.

Franz Schubert wrote several romances, and Giuseppe Verdi wrote "Celeste Aida" about the impossible love for an Ethiopian slave girl.
Poets such as Johann Wolfgang von Goethe and Federico Garcia Lorca wrote romances, which were later set to music, such as Take this waltz by Leonard Cohen.

The close relationship between poems and song lyrics was underscored when Bob Dylan was awarded the Nobel Prize in Literature in 2016 for creating new poetic expressions in the great American song tradition.

Popular music
The love song is not a musical genre or musical style; it occurs in all styles. Yet on the English Wikipedia there are about 40 albums with the title "Love Songs" (ao by The Beatles, Elton John, Frank Sinatra), some with "The Love Songs" and a small 20 with the title "Love Songs by" (Aretha Franklin, Dionne Warwick and Diana Ross, among others).

A music style is considered to be "Lovers rock", a subgenre of Reggae and the "ballad", including the "blues ballad", the "soul ballad" and the "sentimental ballad". A ballad is a melodic pop song, often with an intimate atmosphere. The lyrics are mostly about love. A ballad should not be confused with a 'ballad', a French verse from the 14th and 15th centuries, also used as a song in narrative form, such as the Ballad Of Davy Crockett. In the later 19th century the term was often used for any love song, especially the "sentimental ballad" in pop or rock music.

Another division within the love song is that according to theme.

The largest group are the love songs about a broken heart, they are sometimes less melodic, and sung more raw like Lucinda Williams' "Jackson" in contrast to, for example, Celine Dion's "My Heart Will Go On", the title song of the movie Titanic. The best-selling song about a broken heart is "I Will Always Love You" by Whitney Houston, written by Dolly Parton. Taylor Swift had a fondness for songs on the subject.

Songs can also be about one special loved one, as in Gloria, Michelle and Angie, although it has never been clarified who they were, or Layla, which was written for Pattie Boyd.

Romantic love is often associated with 'candlelight dinners' and 'moonlit walks' so that many love songs are about 'Candlelight' and 'Moon', such as in Van Morrison's "Moondance", or "Moon River" from the movie Breakfast at Tiffany's.

On Google Search can be found hundreds of lists with top 10, top 30 and top 100 love songs, some love songs from Billboard's top 50 (based on number of weeks and position) are:

 "Endless Love" - Diana Ross and Lionel Richie
 "How Deep is Your Love" - Bee Gees
 "She Loves You" - The Beatles

Specifically about sex:
 Olivia Newton-John's "Physical", banned on many radio stations
 Rod Stewart's "Tonight Is the night" and "Da Ya Think I'm Sexy"
 Madonna's "Like a Virgin"

Nobel laureate Bob Dylan wrote "Make You Feel My Love", made a world hit by Adele.

See also
Breakup song
Sentimental ballad

Notes 
The article is based on the Dutch article "Liefdeslied"

Song forms
Love
Ballads
Romance
Love poems
Articles containing video clips